Chestnut: Hero of Central Park is a 2004 Canadian-American family film, starring Makenzie Vega, Abigail Breslin, Christine Tucci, Justin Louis, Tony Alcantar, Irene Olga López, Ethan Phillips, Irene Karas, Barry Bostwick and directed by Robert Vince, about a Great Dane who is adopted by two orphan girls in this heartwarming family film. The girls' new parents don't know about the loveable dog however, and the film revolves around the inventive ways he is kept hidden from his new owners.

Synopsis

Soon after being taken in by a loving new mother and father (Mr. Matt Tomley and Mrs. Laura Tomley), two young former orphans (Sal and Ray) do their best to keep their furry, four-legged friend — a lovable Great Dane named Chestnut — a secret from their adoptive parents and save him from a grim fate at the city pound, where he would certainly be euthanized.

Cast
 Makenzie Vega as Sal
 Abigail Breslin as Ray
 Barry Bostwick as Thomas Trundle
 Christine Tucci as Laura Tomley
 Irene Olga López as Rosa Maria
 Justin Louis as Matt Tomley
 Ethan Phillips as Marty
 Maurice Godin as Wesley

Release

Home media
Chestnut: Hero of Central Park was released on DVD on December 19, 2006 by The Weinstein Company.

References

External links
 

2004 direct-to-video films
American direct-to-video films
2000s English-language films
2004 drama films
Films about dogs
Films directed by Robert Vince
American drama films
Canadian direct-to-video films
Miramax films
Canadian drama films
English-language Canadian films
2004 films
2000s American films
2000s Canadian films